Ammar Helac (born 13 June 1998) is an Austrian professional footballer who plays as a goalkeeper for Austria Lustenau.

Career
Helac is a product of the youth academy of Donau Linz, and began his senior career with them in 2016. On 17 November 2017, he transferred to Blau-Weiß Linz in the 2. Liga. He made his professional debut with Blau-Weiß Linz in a 2–0 2. Liga loss to WSG Tirol on 17 November 2017. After three seasons with them, he moved to Austria Wien on 20 February 2020.

International career
Born in Austria, Helac is of Bosnian descent. He is a youth international for Austria, having represented the Austria U20s and U21s.

References

External links
 
 OEFB Profile

1998 births
Austrian people of Bosnia and Herzegovina descent
Footballers from Linz
Living people
Austrian footballers
Austria youth international footballers
Austria under-21 international footballers
Association football goalkeepers
FC Blau-Weiß Linz players
FK Austria Wien players
SC Austria Lustenau players
Austrian Football Bundesliga players
2. Liga (Austria) players